NUST School of Electrical Engineering and Computer Science (NUST-SEECS), formerly NUST Institute of Information Technology, is a constituent school in Islamabad, Pakistan. It was created on a self-financed basis in April 1999 as a constituent college of National University of Sciences and Technology, Pakistan (NUST). It was formed due to the demand for quality IT education in the country and the requirement for NUST to launch its own IT department.

Degree programs
The school is split into two departments offering programs in both graduate and undergraduate levels.

 Department of Electrical Engineering
 Bachelor's in Electrical Engineering 
 Master's in Communication and Computer Security 
MS/Ph.D in Electrical Engineering
 Department of Computing
 Bachelors in Software Engineering
 Bachelors in Computer Science
 MS/Ph.D in Computer Science
 MS in Information Security
 Master's in Information Technology 
 Ph.D in Information Technology

Research Groups and Labs

Information Processing and Transmissions Lab (IPT) 
IPT Lab focuses on the intersectional areas of communications theory, signal processing theory and applied mathematics. The current focus of the IPT lab is the design of 5G/6G Wireless communication algorithms with a variety of allied areas such as IOT, networking, statistical signal processing and estimations & detection etc.

System Analysis and Verification Lab (SAVe)
System Analysis and Verification Lab, SAVe, focuses research on using formal methods, which are based on mathematical techniques and thus unlike simulation ensure complete results, for the analysis and verification of hardware, software, and embedded systems.

Data Engineering for Large Scale Applications (DELSA)
The Data Engineering for Large Scale Applications, DELSA, research group explores semantics, databases, and interoperable systems in scientific and business domains. The research group aims at broadening the focus of database and data management techniques beyond their traditional scope.

Smart Machines And Robotics Technology (SMART) Lab
SMART Lab is currently working on developing a training system for laparoscopic and robotic tele-surgery in collaboration with Holy Family Hospital, Pakistan. Other areas of research include simulator design, intelligent robots and vision based algorithms for mobile robots. Some projects include a speech controlled robotic arm, an autonomous robotic platform and a robotic soccer environment for LEGO Mindstorms.

Research laboratory for Communication, Networks & Multimedia (Connekt)
Research laboratory for Communication, Networks & Multimedia, Connekt, addresses research problems arising in three areas: Multimedia Communications, Wireless Networks and the Internet. Areas of particular interest include Networking, Applied Information Theory and Network Performance Analysis. Lab's current research interest spans the theory and design of novel algorithms and frameworks for reliable multimedia transmission, processing and ubiquitous communication over Internet and wireless networks.

TUKL NUST Research and development lab
Established on the model of German Research Center for Artificial Intelligence (DFKI), which serves as a role model for creating world-class on-campus research center.

International Collaborations

SEECS has developed partnerships with a number of international companies including Microsoft which has awarded NUST the status of Authorized Academic Training Program Institute (AATPI), Intel and other educational organization such as ACM (Associate of Computing Machinery), IEEE and IAESTE.

SEECS also has been awarded the status of "Associate Research Institute" of CERN, the European Organization for Nuclear Research in Geneva, Switzerland. Since 2000, NUST-SEECS has been working on collaborative on distributed computing problems relating to GRID problems.

Other Activities 

In February 2014, SEECS signed a mutual agreement with Pak-Finland council to cooperate in the fields of healthcare, energy, IT and telecommunication. In March 2014, SEECS launched a greenhouse center with in order to promote entrepreneurship activities in the campus.

It also plans to launch the first science and technology park of Pakistan with the aim to strengthen linkages among academia, researchers and the industrial sector.

See also
National University of Sciences and Technology, Pakistan

References

External links
 SEECS official website
 NUST official website

National University of Sciences & Technology
Universities and colleges in Islamabad
Information technology institutes
Computer science institutes in Pakistan
1999 establishments in Pakistan
Electrical engineering departments